Associate deputy attorney general is a position in the Office of the Deputy Attorney General in United States Department of Justice. The number of positions varies widely depending on the staffing discretion of the deputy attorney general, but in 2017, there were five such positions, all of whom served as advisors to the deputy attorney general. There is also a separate principal associate deputy attorney general, who is the principal advisor to the deputy attorney general, and to whom all associate deputy attorneys general report. The associate deputy attorney general positions are filled by Senior Executive Service (SES) career attorneys, by SES political appointees, or by non-SES career attorneys serving on detail assignments from elsewhere in the department.

The position is not to be confused with the deputy associate attorneys general, who report to the associate attorney general.

List

Nixon administration 

 Charles D. Ablard

Ford administration 

Rudy Giuliani
Togo D. West Jr.

Reagan administration 

 Randy Levine (Principal)
 James H. Burnley IV
 Roger Clegg
 Bruce Fein
 Wayne L. Kidwell

George H. W. Bush administration 

Dee Benson
Peter Ferrara

Clinton administration 

Merrick Garland (Principal)
Robert S. Litt (Principal)
Irvin B. Nathan (Principal)
Edward C. DuMont
Paul J. Fishman
Andrew Fois
Brian Anthony Jackson
Rory K. Little
David Margolis
David W. Ogden
Catherine M. Russell
Seth P. Waxman
Monty Wilkinson

George W. Bush administration 

William W. Mercer (Principal)
Christopher A. Wray (Principal)
Ted Cruz
David S. Kris
Stuart A. Levey
Kevin J. O'Connor
Johnny Sutton
Karen Tandy
Patrick B. Murray

Obama administration 

Lisa Monaco (Principal)
Kathryn Ruemmler (Principal)
Stuart Goldberg (Principal)
Matthew Axelrod (Principal)
David O'Neil
Armando Omar Bonilla
Samir Jain
Neil MacBride
Steven Reich
Carlos Uriarte
Donald B. Verrilli Jr.
Miriam Vogel

Trump administration 

James A. Crowell (Principal)
Robert K. Hur (Principal)
Ed O'Callaghan (Principal)
Seth D. DuCharme (Principal)
Richard Donoghue (Principal)
Antoinette Bacon
Adam Braverman
Zachary Bolitho
Steve Cook
Erin Creegan
Richard DiZinno
Christopher Grieco
Brendan Groves
Stacie Harris
Jarad Hodes
Bruce Ohr
Patrick Hovakimian
William Hughes
Amanda Liskamm
Jennifer Mascott
Michael Murray
Sujit Raman
Scott Schools
G. Zachary Terwilliger 
Robyn Thiemann
David Wetmore

Biden administration 
 John P. Carlin (Principal)
 Marshall Miller (Principal)
 David Newman
 Emily Loeb
 Kevin Chambers

References 

United States Department of Justice